Saiwyn Quadras is an Indian screenwriter, who has written the biopics Mary Kom (2014) and Neerja (2016). He was also the writer of  Parmanu: The Story of Pokhran (2018). His upcoming film as a writer is Maidaan starring Ajay Devgn.

Career 
He began his career in the entertainment industry as a screenwriter, working on several critically acclaimed films such as "Neerja" (2016), "Mary Kom (2014). 

In 2017, he won the National Film Award for Best Screenplay for "Neerja" and was also nominated for the Filmfare Award for Best Screenplay for the same film.

Quadras is also a mentor and a speaker in the Indian film industry, known for his work with aspiring screenwriters and filmmakers.

Filmography
Mary Kom (2014)
Neerja (2016)
Parmanu: The Story of Pokhran (2018)
Maidaan (2021)

Awards

References

External links
 

Living people
Indian male screenwriters
Year of birth missing (living people)